Operation Grenadier was a series of 16 nuclear tests conducted by the United States in 1984–1985 at the Nevada Test Site. These tests followed the Operation Fusileer series and preceded the Operation Charioteer series.

References

Explosions in 1984
Explosions in 1985
1984 in military history
1985 in military history
Grenadier